The 1962–63 Austrian Hockey League season was the 33rd season of the Austrian Hockey League, the top level of ice hockey in Austria. Seven teams participated in the league, and Innsbrucker EV won the championship.

Regular season

External links
Austrian Ice Hockey Association

Aus
Austrian Hockey League seasons 
Aust